Busty and the Bass is a Canadian electro-soul and hip hop band from Montreal, Quebec. The band is known for its unique brand of music, which incorporates two vocalists, a horn section, and a diverse range of musical genres.

Having met while attending college at McGill University, seven of the nine founding members are still with the band: Evan Crofton a.k.a. Alistair Blu (vocals, keyboards, synths), Scott Bevins (trumpet), Chris Vincent (trombone), Louis Stein (guitar), Milo Johnson (bass), Eric Haynes (keyboards, piano) and Julian Trivers (drums). To date, Busty and the Bass has put out two EPs, GLAM (2015) and LIFT (2016), and one full-length album, Uncommon Good, which was released on 8 September 2017. The band was previously signed to Montreal's Indica Records, along with other notable acts such as Half Moon Run and Phantogram.

In 2014, Busty and the Bass beat out hundreds of other musical acts to win CBC and TD Bank's Rock Your Campus competition, earning the title of Canada's Top University Band. Since then, the band has toured extensively across Canada, the United States, and Europe, and performed at festivals including Osheaga, Pinkpop, the Montreal International Jazz Festival, and Made in America.

History

Background

With each member originating from different parts of North America, the band is composed of three Americans, three Canadians, and two Canadian-American dual citizens. The band's Canadian-born members comprise Crofton (Victoria, B.C.), Ferraro (Toronto, Ontario), Haynes (Calgary, Alberta), and Vincent (Mississauga, Ontario). Those from the United States include Bevins (Hartford, Connecticut), Johnson (Silver Spring, Maryland), Stein (New York, New York), and Trivers (Los Angeles, California).

2011–2014: Formation and early years

All members of the band were students at McGill University's Schulich School of Music. The earliest iteration of the band formed for an informal jam session at a house party hosted on the shared patio of guitarist Stein's apartment a block away from the Mont-Royal Metro station. Originally, Busty and the Bass performed exclusively instrumental compositions and covers of popular songs, embracing horn melodies in the absence of a lead vocalist.

According to vocalist Nick Ferraro, the band's name stuck after it came up during their first week of playing together. While the band once considered finding a more serious name, Ferraro says they enjoy the irony of a collective having a mystery front person, and the opportunity for all members of the band to be "Busty" at some point.

In the fall of 2014, Busty and the Bass launched a bid to compete for the title of Canada's Top University Band. The band's first-ever song with vocals, "Tryna Find Myself," was also their entry to the CBC competition. On 27 October 2014, CBC and TD Bank announced Busty and the Bass as the winners of the nationwide competition. Busty and the Bass was awarded a $10,000 prize and a concert at Montreal's Corona Theatre opening for Arkells.

2015: GLAM EP

Following the band's success in the CBC competition, Busty and the Bass began work on their self-produced debut EP with Los Angeles-based recording engineer Jesse String. In June 2015, after signing to Montreal's Indica Records, the band released GLAM, an eight-track EP led by single "The Real".

2016: LIFT EP

On 1 July 2016, Busty and the Bass released their second EP, LIFT, following the release of the single "Miss Judge". The six-track extended play was intended as a precursor to the band's debut album, and was made over the course of two months in the basement of an apartment on Saint Urbain Street shared by four band members, and at the studios of Indica Records on Saint Laurent Boulevard.

The release included a cover of Macy Gray's "I Try", an audience favourite that the band was known to play live.  On 20 April 2016, Busty and the Bass posted a video of their "I Try" cover to YouTube, which was met with immediate acclaim. Music blog The Undiscovered wrote, "Taking on Macy Gray's smash hit, Busty and the Bass transform 'I Try' from a vocal-fueled r&b mega hit into a funky, horn-filled jam that will have you singing along and grooving with the beat". The video was later shared by Macy Gray on Twitter, who endorsed the band's rendition of her seminal hit, saying "beeyooteefoh! WATCH DIS!!".

In 2016, Busty and the Bass were announced in the lineups for the Osheaga Music and Arts Festival and the Quebec City Summer Festival.
The band's performance supporting Half Moon Run at Paris' Fête de la Musique was also praised by Rolling Stone France, which called Busty and the Bass "one of our favourite discoveries this summer".

2017: Uncommon Good

Busty and the Bass' debut album Uncommon Good was announced by the band on 30 June 2017, via a Facebook post addressed to their fans. The album, which took over a year and a half to make, was executive produced by hip hop producer and audio engineer Neal Pogue. Perhaps best known for his work with Atlanta-bred hip hop duo Outkast, for which he won a Grammy Award for Album of the Year, Pogue has also worked with other notable acts such as Snoop Dogg, Earth Wind and Fire, M.I.A., Nicki Minaj, Aretha Franklin, and Lil Wayne. Pogue travelled to Montreal on three occasions to work with Busty and the Bass after their manager shared the band's demos with Pogue's manager.

The album's ten tracks were developed through the band's collaborative composition process, through which a combination of 1-3 band members begin composing a song, bringing it to the rest of the group for input and experimentation later on. The majority of the record was recorded at the Indica Records studio, in the Plateau neighbourhood of Montreal.

On 19 January 2017, the band released the album's lead single, "Up Top," which was received favourably by fans and critics, with HuffPost remarking, "Discovering this kind of musical chemistry with such a large group in a short span of time is more than just luck—it's a calling". On 14 September 2017, Busty and the Bass released a dance video for the track, which was directed and choreographed by Kate Ramsden.

Uncommon Good's second single, "Memories and Melodies," was released on 5 April 2017. The album's third single, "Common Ground," was released on 30 June 2017, with a music video filmed during the band's spring European tour and directed by Greg McCahon released on 6 July 2017. The album's final single, "Closer," was released on 25 August 2017, and was included in Spotify Canada's New Music Friday playlist. The full album was released on 8 September 2017 at a sold-out show at the New York venue Mercury Lounge.

Busty and the Bass continued touring throughout 2017, including performances at Pinkpop, Made in America, SXSW, The Great Escape, Ottawa Bluesfest, and Rifflandia. On 8 July 2017, Busty and the Bass opened for Anderson .Paak at the Montreal International Jazz Festival for a crowd of over 80,000 people.

2019–present
On 5 November 2019, Busty and the Bass returned with a brand new single, "Clouds", which premiered on BBC Radio 1Xtra. The release also contained "Summer", a B-side track that later received a music video filmed in Montreal's St. James United Church.

In early 2020, Busty and the Bass signed to Arts & Crafts. The news, announced by the Canadian record label in a press release, was accompanied by a new song, "Baggy Eyed Dopeman". Featuring funk pioneer George Clinton of Parliament and Funkadelic, the song premiered on the Billboard magazine website. In a comment to Billboard on the release and how the collaboration with George Clinton came to be, Ferraro stated, "We sent it to him and we had the vocals kind of set. He sent his shit back and I was like, 'Oh shit – I've got to redo everything I did!' So I went back in and was trying to close my eyes and pretend we were in there together – which was easy, 'cause he's such a strong presence on the record. I was happy we did that, 'cause we all felt like we had to take it to another level with him on there."

In March 2022, it was announced through Busty's Instagram page that Nick Ferraro would be leaving the band to pursue personal interests.

Style

The band's oeuvre is marked by pronounced horn lines, rich melodies, and a seamless blend of disparate genres. Compositionally, Busty and the Bass skew toward dance-centric music, incorporating elements from radio-friendly pop, modern jazz, and hip hop.

Labels, agencies and management

Managers - Michael Sayegh, Lighter Than Air
Labels - Arts & Crafts (Canada)
Agents - Preste Spectacles (Quebec), The Feldman Agency (Canada), Paradigm Talent Agency (USA), Coda Agency (Europe)

Band members
Scott Bevins – trumpet
Alistair Blu – vocals, keyboard, synthesizer
Eric Haynes – piano, keyboard
Milo Johnson – bass
Louis Stein – guitar
Julian Trivers – drums
Chris Vincent – trombone

Past Members
Nick Ferraro – vocals, alto saxophone
Mike McCann - trumpet

Discography

Studio albums

Uncommon Good (2017)
Eddie (2020)

Extended plays

GLAM (2015)
LIFT (2016)

Singles
 "Tryna Find Myself" (2015)
 "The Real" (2015)
 "Models" (2015)
 "Miss Judge" (2016)
 "Stages (Don't Know Why)" (2016)
 "Up Top" (2017)
 "Memories and Melodies" (2017)
 "Common Ground" (2017)
 "Closer" (2017)
 "Jimmy" (featuring Pierre Kwenders) (2018)

References

External links
 

2011 establishments in Quebec
Musical groups from Montreal
Musical groups established in 2011
Canadian hip hop groups
Canadian soul music groups